Jean-Pierre-Dominique Zévaco (30 July 1925 – 25 July 2017) was a Catholic bishop.

Zévaco was born in France and was ordained to the priesthood in 1959. He was appointed bishop of the Diocese of Fort-Dauphin, Malagasy Republic,  and served as bishop of the diocese until 2001. In 1989, the name of the diocese was changed to the Roman Catholic Diocese of Tôlagnaro, Malagasy Republic.

Notes

1925 births
2017 deaths
20th-century Roman Catholic bishops in Madagascar
Roman Catholic bishops of Tôlagnaro
French expatriates in Madagascar
French Roman Catholic bishops in Africa